Raza-ul-Hasan (born 26 November 1987) is a Pakistani cricketer. He made his first-class debut for Karachi Whites in the 2009–10 Quaid-e-Azam Trophy on 9 December 2009. In January 2021, he was named in Balochistan's squad for the 2020–21 Pakistan Cup.

References

External links
 

1987 births
Living people
Pakistani cricketers
Balochistan cricketers
Karachi Whites cricketers
Cricketers from Karachi